Ghost Notes is the fifth full-length studio album by American rock band Veruca Salt, released on July 10, 2015, through El Camino Records. It is the first to feature the band's original lineup since their second album, Eight Arms to Hold You (1997).

Background
Following the band's 1997 release Eight Arms to Hold You, drummer Jim Shapiro quit. Shortly after, in 1998, Nina Gordon and bassist Steve Lack also left, leading Louise Post to release two new Veruca Salt albums with other musicians, Resolver in 2000, and IV in 2006. Gordon told The Los Angeles Times that after seeing the reception from Mazzy Star's 2012 reunion she got the desire to make music with Post again. The two met up for the first time in 14 years and began writing music that would become Ghost Notes.

Production and release
For Ghost Notes, the four original band members collaborated more on songwriting than they had before. The lyrics focused on their shared experiences, with Gordon saying, "I think a lot of the content in the new songs is about our feelings surrounding the breakup, regrets about the breakup, the thrill of getting back together. It's really not so much about our individual lives the way it used to be."

Ghost Notes was released on July 10, 2015. It was produced by Brad Wood, who also produced Veruca Salt's debut American Thighs. Two of the songs had previously been released. "The Museum of Broken Relationships" was on the band's 2014 Record Store Day release MMXIV, and "Black and Blonde" is a new recording (with a new chorus and revised lyrics) of a song originally recorded by Gordon for her first solo album, Tonight and the Rest of My Life (2000).

The double-LP vinyl edition released by El Camino in January 2016 features a revised track listing with three additional selections.

Critical reception

Ghost Notes received mostly positive reviews from music critics. At Metacritic, which assigns a normalized rating out of 100 to reviews from mainstream critics, the album has an average score of 78 out of 100, which indicates "generally favorable reviews", based on 12 reviews.

Writing for Consequence of Sound and rating the album a "B", Nina Corcoran said, "Veruca Salt are still writing catchy, raging songs, but the naivety of their intent and its two-decade-old edits are miles away here." Matt Williams of Now Magazine rated the album four stars out of five and stated, "Gordon and Post haven't missed a beat. In fact, they might be better than ever." The A.V. Club'''s Alex McCown called Ghost Notes'' "a potent and affecting record, with a deep well of emotional resonance Veruca Salt never really had before."

Accolades

Track listing

Personnel
Credits adapted from AllMusic.

Veruca Salt
Louise Post – guitar, vocals
Nina Gordon – guitar, vocals
Steve Lack – bass guitar
Jim Shapiro – drums, vocals (backing)

Additional musicians
Kay Hanley – vocals
Michelle Lewis – vocals
Christian Lane – vocals (backing)
Joel Mark – handclapping
Sophie Mark – handclapping 
Chick Wolverton – percussion

Production
Emily Lazar – mastering
Ken Sluiter – engineer
Brad Wood – engineer, mixing, orchestra, production

Charts

Release history

References

External links
 Official website 

2015 albums
Veruca Salt albums
Albums produced by Brad Wood